The Aiguille du Plat de la Selle, 3,596 m, is a mountain of the Massif des Écrins in the Dauphiné Alps in south-eastern France. Ascents of the mountain are via Saint-Christophe-en-Oisans or the Soreiller hut.

References

See also
 List of mountains of the Alps

Mountains of the Alps
Mountains of Isère
Alpine three-thousanders
Dauphiné Alps